Eric Albert Huppatz (11 January 1918 – 6 September 1983) was an Australian rules footballer who played with Footscray in the Victorian Football League (VFL).

Notes

External links 

1918 births
1983 deaths
Australian rules footballers from Victoria (Australia)
Western Bulldogs players